L.A. Raeven is a name for Liesbeth and Angelique Raeven, Dutch twins and collaborative artist duo known for installation art, video art, and performance art. They live in Amsterdam.

They were born in 1971 in Heerlen, Netherlands. Some of their artwork focuses on the love-hate tension they feel in a twin relationship, as well as identity, and thinness. Their video installation which includes two films that form a diptych, Wild Zone 1 (2001) and Wild Zone 2 (2002) are works focused on the body autonomy and malleability of one's own body (in pursuit of thinness). It has been compared to work by Gilbert and George.

References

External links 
 Official website
 
 

Art duos
Living people
People from Heerlen
Artists from Amsterdam
Dutch conceptual artists
Dutch video artists
Dutch installation artists
21st-century Dutch women artists
Dutch twins
Year of birth missing (living people)